Dave Armstrong is a Canadian record producer and DJ who had a number one on the UK Dance Chart with the track "Love Has Gone" in January 2008. The track was a collaboration with Redroche and H-Boogie and was released on the Hed Kandi label. The single made #43 on the official UK singles chart.

Singles

2002
"Prime Kutz"

2003
"Make Your Move"
"Release The Tension"
"Groove In You" with Steve Angello

2004
"Out Of Time"
"Out Of Touch"

2005
"Come Back"
"Love Has Gone" with RedRoche

2006
"Bella"
"Just Do It"

2007
"Love Has Gone" with RedRoche feat. H-Boogie

References

External links
http://www.discogs.com/artist/Dave+Armstrong

Living people
Year of birth missing (living people)
Place of birth missing (living people)
Canadian dance musicians
Canadian record producers
Musicians from Vancouver